The Ghost Bride is a 2020 Taiwanese-Malaysian Netflix original series co-directed by Malaysian directors Quek Shio-chuan and Ho Yu-hang. It is based on the novel The Ghost Bride written by Malaysian writer Yangsze Choo, and stars Huang Pei-jia, Wu Kang-jen, Ludi Lin, and Kuang Tian.

Set in 1890s Colonial Malacca, a Malaysian Chinese woman accepts a marriage proposal from a wealthy family to be the "ghost bride" to their deceased son - an opportunity that would save her family from a lifetime of debt, but require her to spend the rest of her days haunted by a ghostly spouse. Desperate to escape the situation, she soon finds herself wrapped up in a murder mystery and embroiled in otherworldly affairs far bigger than she could have imagined.

Synopsis
In 1890s Malacca, Li-lan finds herself in the afterlife and becomes mired in a mystery linked to the sinister, deceased son of a wealthy family.

Cast

Main
Huang Pei-jia as Pan Li-lan, the ghost bride
Wu Kang-ren as Er-lang, a 500-year-old deity
Ludi Lin as Lim Tian-bai, Li-lan's childhood friend
Kuang Tian as Lim Tian-ching, the Lims' deceased son whom Li-lan marries

Recurring
Janet Hsieh as Hsiao-yu, Li-lan's deceased mother
Susan Leong as Amah, the Pan family housekeeper
Jordan Voon as Mr. Pan, Li-lan's father
Wilson Tin as Old Wong, the Pan family's chef who can talk to ghosts
Angeline Tan as Madam Lim, Tian-ching's mother
Jojo Goh as Lim Yan-hong, Tian-ching's older half-sister
Teresa Daley as Isabel, Tian-bai's betrothed
Meeki Ng as Yu-li, Li-lan's friend

Episodes

Season 1 (2020)

References

External links
 
 

Mandarin-language Netflix original programming
Taiwanese drama television series
Malaysian drama television series
2020 Taiwanese television series debuts